Chrysoteuchia hyalodiscella is a moth in the family Crambidae. It was described by Aristide Caradja in 1927. It is found in Sichuan, China.

References

Crambini
Moths described in 1927
Moths of Asia